Geopiety is "the belief and worship of powers behind nature or the human environment". It was coined by the American geographer John Kirtland Wright for geographical piety.

The term "geopiety" comes from a combination of the Greek root geo, for earth, and the Latin root "pietas". As Wright explained when coining the term, geopiety is meant to refer to "emotional piety aroused by awareness of terrestrial diversity of the kind of which geography is also a form of awareness".

One example of geopiety can be found in the works of American preacher Jonathan Edwards:

See also

 Religion and geography

References

Bibliography
 
 

Human geography